Tivulaghju is an archaeological site in Corsica. It is located in the commune of Porto-Vecchio.  The site was first excavated in 1960, and has since been used to prove prehistoric links between Corsica and Sardinia.

References
 Prehistoire.org bulletin 

Archaeological sites in Corsica